The 1971 Australian Formula 2 Championship was a CAMS sanctioned motor racing title for drivers of Australian Formula 2 racing cars. It was the fifth Australian Formula 2 Championship.

Calendar
The championship was contested over a six heat series with one race per heat. Heats were staged concurrently with those of the 1971 Australian Drivers' Championship which was open to drivers of both Australian Formula 1 and Australian Formula 2 cars.
 Heat 1, Governor's Trophy, Lakeside, Queensland, 6 June
 Heat 2, Angus & Coote Diamond Trophy, Oran Park, New South Wales, 27 June
 Heat 3, Glynn Scott Memorial Trophy, Surfers Paradise, Queensland, 29 August
 Heat 4, Victoria Trophy, Sandown Park, Victoria, 12 September
 Heat 5, Symmons Plains, Tasmania, 25 September
 Heat 6, Rothmans Trophy, Mallala, South Australia, 11 October

Points system
Championship points were awarded on a 9–6–4–3–2–1 basis to the first six placegetters in the Formula 2 class at each heat. Each driver could retain points only from his/her best five heat results.

Results

Note:
 Only four Formula 2 cars were classified as finishers at Heat 4
 Only three Formula 2 cars were classified as finishers at Heat 5
 Only two Formula 2 cars were classified as finishers at Heat 6

References

External links
 CAMS Online Manual of Motor Sport > About CAMS > Titles – Australian Titles
 Image of 1971 AF2 Champion Henk Woelders (Elfin 600C) at Surfers Paradise

Australian Formula 2 Championship
Formula 2 Championship